Birbaha Hansda is an Indian politician and former actress who currently serves as Cabinet Minister for Self Help Group & Self-Employment and Minister of State for Forests and Consumer Affairs of the Government of West Bengal. She is the Minister of State for Forest and Minister of state for Consumer Affairs, Government of West Bengal and the Member of Legislative Assembly of Jhargram constituency. As an actress, Hansda has appeared predominantly in Santali language films as well as acted in a few Bengali and Hindi language films.

Early life 
Hansda was born in Aankro village in the Indian state of West Bengal in a Santal family. Her late father Naren Hansda was the founder of the Jharkhand Party (Naren). Her father and her mother Chunibala Hansda were members of the West Bengal Legislative Assembly. Hansda participated in the elections.

She completed her Higher Secondary at Ghatshila College, and graduated from the University of Calcutta. She started acting at an early age.

Career 
Hansda began working with actress and producer Prem Mardi. Her 2008 debut film was Ado Alom Aso Aa'।. She received praise for her performance. Other films include Achchha Thik Geya, Aas Tanhe Ena Amre, Amge Sari Dulariya (2012), Tode Sutam (2013), Jupur Juli, Aalom Rejinya Sakom Sindoor (2013), Jawai Orah Bongay Chapal Kiding (2014), Malang and Fulmoni. She has worked in songs and music videos, such as 'A Na Mosla Baha' (2014), 'A Dogor Na' (2014), 'Chag Cho Chando' (2014) and 'Gorom Sari Sari'. Hansda won the 2021 West Bengal Legislative Assembly election from Jhargram (Vidhan Sabha constituency) as a candidate of AITC.

Awards 
 From the year 2008 to 2012, the Santali Filmfare Award was received.
 RASCA Award.
 Lastly, her film Fulmoni is 122nd in the Delhi International Film Competition, 2018.
 Reception from Chief Minister of West Bengal Mamata Banerjee, 2019.

References 

Living people
1980s births
Indian film actresses
Women in West Bengal politics
Jharkhand Party (Naren) politicians
Santali people
People from Jhargram district
Trinamool Congress politicians from West Bengal